Peter James Gaudet (born March 27, 1942) is an American college basketball coach. He played varsity basketball for Iona Prep in 1959 and 1960 before going to Boston University, where he graduated in 1966.

He began his collegiate coaching career as an assistant to Mike Krzyzewski at Army. When Krzyzewski left for Duke in 1980, Gaudet was named his successor as head coach.

After leaving Duke, Gaudet worked as an assistant men's basketball coach for the Vanderbilt Commodores men's basketball program before moving as an assistant to the women's basketball programs at Vanderbilt and Ohio State.

At Duke
After leaving the Army program in 1982, Gaudet rejoined his former boss at Duke, serving as Krzyzewski's top assistant from 1982 to 1995. During this time, Gaudet worked alongside current Notre Dame head coach Mike Brey, current Harvard head coach Tommy Amaker, and current ESPN analyst Jay Bilas. He helped lead Duke to two NCAA men's championships and seven Final Four appearances. An expert in player development, Gaudet coached eight All-Americans, three National Players of the Year and 12 NBA draft picks.

When Krzyzewski took a leave of absence in early 1995 due to a back injury, Gaudet was promoted to interim head coach. He inherited a team that had started 9–3, but the team struggled to an eventual record of 13–18 overall and 2–14 in the ACC—still the most losses in school history. Despite Gaudet's interim status, in accordance with NCAA guidance Duke credited the final 19 games of the season to him rather than to Krzyzewski, though Gaudet expresses no regrets or bitterness concerning this.

In the midst of a landmark class action lawsuit against the NCAA, Gaudet did not return to the Blue Devils' bench for the 1995–1996 season.

Head coaching record

References

External links
 Article on Coach Pete Gaudet's Hiring as Head Coach of India Women's Senior National Team

1942 births
Living people
American men's basketball coaches
Army Black Knights men's basketball coaches
Boston University alumni
Duke Blue Devils men's basketball coaches
Ohio State Buckeyes women's basketball coaches
Iona Preparatory School alumni
Vanderbilt Commodores women's basketball coaches
People from Needham, Massachusetts
Basketball coaches from Massachusetts